Twickler Cone is a cone-shaped peak in the Asgard Range, Victoria Land, rising to 1,950 m on the ridge separating the upper reaches of Bartley Glacier and Newall Glacier. Named by Advisory Committee on Antarctic Names (US-ACAN) in 1997 after Mark S. Twickler, a specialist in recovery, analysis, and interpretation of ice core records, with many seasons in Antarctica and Greenland, 1984–95; executive director, National Ice Core Laboratory-Science Management Office, from 1997. As a member of a University of New Hampshire field party, 1988–89, Twickler participated in glaciochemical investigations that collected two ice cores, 150 and 175 m deep, from upper Newall Glacier, in proximity of this peak.

Mountains of the Asgard Range
McMurdo Dry Valleys